Austin-Tindall Regional Park is an athletic facility located in Kissimmee, Florida. The park is host to a variety of annual events in soccer, football, lacrosse, and rugby, and has also hosted field hockey and archery events.

The facility consists of eight fields, of which five are 75 X  and have lights and scoreboards. Of the other three fields; one is 30 X  and the other two are 40 X .

Annual Events -
1. Various Disney Sports Soccer Events
2. United States Flag & Touch Football Championships
3. National Christian College Athletic Association Division 1 & 2 Soccer Championships
4. World Class Lacrosse Pre-Season Training 
5. Soccer Six 6v6 Adult Soccer Events
6. Reeth - Puffer High School Girls Soccer Training 
7. Greater Osceola United Soccer Club Spring & Fall Seasons

The park was the practice facility for the 1994 Moroccan World Cup Team and the 1996 Japanese Olympic Team. It also hosted the National Archery Association of the United States' 112th Kodak National Target Championship in August 1996.

External links 
 Austin-Tindall Park (official site)

Urban public parks
Parks in Florida
Sports venues in Greater Orlando
Kissimmee, Florida
Protected areas of Osceola County, Florida
Sports in Kissimmee, Florida
Soccer venues in Florida
American football venues in Florida
Lacrosse venues in the United States
Field hockey venues in the United States
Sports venues completed in 1993
1993 establishments in Florida